Damages is an American legal thriller television series created by Todd A. Kessler, Glenn Kessler and Daniel Zelman and produced by KZK Productions, Sony Pictures Television, FX Productions, Bluebush Productions and Gotham Music Placement. The series chronicles the relationship between Patty Hewes (Glenn Close), a high powered attorney, and her protégée Ellen Parsons (Rose Byrne) as well as the major case they take on each season. Damages aired on FX from July 24, 2007 to September 12, 2012, broadcasting 59 episodes over five seasons during its initial run.

During the series' run, Damages received nominations for a variety of different awards, including 20 Emmy awards (with 4 wins), eight Golden Globe Awards (with one win), four Screen Actors Guild Awards, and 4 TCA Awards. Glenn Close, for her portrayal of Patty Hewes, received the most individual awards and nominations, winning 2 Emmy awards, a Golden Globe award and a Satellite award.

Awards and nominations

Emmy Awards

Damages received 20 Primetime Emmy Award nominations, with four wins — three Primetime and one Creative Arts. The series received two nominations for the award for Outstanding Drama Series in 2008 and 2009. Glenn Close won the award for Outstanding Lead Actress in a Drama Series in 2008 and 2009, and received a nomination for the award in 2010 and 2012. The series received nominations for Outstanding Supporting Actor in a Drama Series four times, with Željko Ivanek receiving the award in 2008. The series won a Creative Arts Emmy Award for Outstanding Casting for a Drama Series in 2008.

Primetime Emmy Awards

Creative Arts Emmy Awards

Golden Globe Awards

Damages received eight Golden Globe Award nominations during its tenure, with one win for Best Actress – Television Series Drama for Glenn Close.

Golden Reel Awards

Satellite Awards

Screen Actors Guild Awards
Damages received four Screen Actors Guild Award nominations, all for Outstanding Performance by a Female Actor in a Drama Series for Glenn Close.

Television Critics Association Awards
During its tenure, Damages received four TCA Award nominations - two for the series and two individual awards for Glenn Close.

Other awards

References

External links
 List of Primetime Emmy Awards received by Damages
 List of awards and nominations received by Damages at the Internet Movie Database

Damages